Ouzhuang Station is an interchange station between Line 5 and Line 6 on the Guangzhou Metro in the Yuexiu District of Guangzhou. It is located under the junction of East Huanshi Road and Nonglinxia Road, It opened on 28December 2009.

Station layout

Exits

References

Railway stations in China opened in 2009
Guangzhou Metro stations in Yuexiu District